Okemos is a census-designated place (CDP) in Ingham County in the U.S. state of Michigan. The population of the CDP was 25,121 at the 2020 census. Okemos is part of the urban area of Lansing–East Lansing, and is located nearby the campus of Michigan State University. Okemos is located mostly within Meridian Charter Township, with a small portion extending south into Alaiedon Township and east into Williamstown Township.

Okemos contains its own post offices with the 48805 and 48864 ZIP Codes, as well as its own school district, Okemos Public Schools, that also serves portions of the surrounding area.

History

Pioneer Freeman Bray platted the village in 1841, giving it the name of Hamilton. Residents called it Okemos, after chief John Okemos ("Little Chief"), of the Ojibway (Chippewa) people. In 1859, the State legislature officially named the village "Okemos" in honor of the chief.

The Red Cedar River, a tributary of the Grand River, flows from east to west through Okemos.

Climate
This climatic region is typified by large seasonal temperature differences, with warm to hot (and often humid) summers and cold (sometimes severely cold) winters.  According to the Köppen Climate Classification system, Okemos has a humid continental climate, abbreviated "Dfb" on climate maps.

Demographics

As of the census of 2010, there were 21,369 people, 8,824 households, and 5,416 families residing in the CDP. The racial makeup of the CDP was 76.5% White, 14.4% Asian, 5.1% Black or African American, 0.3% Native American, 0.1% Pacific Islander, 1.1% from other races, and 2.6% from two or more races. Hispanic or Latino of any race were 3.3% of the population.

There were 9,194 households, out of which 31.7% had children under the age of 18 living with them, 52.3% were married couples living together, 6.7% had a female householder with no husband present, and 38.6% were non-families. 25.9% of all households were made up of individuals, and 4.7% had someone living alone who was 65 years of age or older.  The average household size was 2.44 and the average family size was 3.04.

In the CDP, 23.9% of the population was under the age of 18, 14.5% was from 18 to 24, 26.0% from 25 to 44, 25.9% from 45 to 64, and 9.7% who were 65 years of age or older.  The median age was 35 years. For every 100 females, there were 93.5 males.  For every 100 females age 18 and over, there were 90.1 males.

The median income for an average household in the CDP was $62,810, and the median income for a family was $88,459 (These figures had risen to $75,736 and $101,903 respectively as of a 2007 estimate). Males had a median income of $60,601 versus $41,393 for females. The per capita income for the CDP was $33,401.  About 3.3% of families and 9.6% of the population were below the poverty line, including 5.0% of those under age 18 and 0.5% of those age 65 or over.

In 2011, CNN Money Magazine rated Okemos as the 12th-best city to live in for "the rich and single".

Education

Most of Okemos is in Okemos Public Schools, which operates Okemos High School.

Portions are in Williamston Community Schools and Mason Public Schools.

Notable people 
Travis Bader. professional basketball player
Kim Chi, stage name of Sang-Young Shin, a Korean-American drag queen, artist
Doc Corbin Dart, punk rock musician
Curtis Cregan, singer and theater actor
Monica Drake, author
Lawrence Joseph Giacoletto, electrical engineer and inventor
Madison Hubbell, 2018 US Olympic ice dancer
James Hynes, novelist, born in Okemos in 1955
Susan Jacoby, author, born and raised in Okemos
Josh Meyers, comedian, MADtv cast member
Seth Meyers, comedian, Saturday Night Live attended Edgewood Elementary
Taylor Moton, NFL player, attended Okemos Public Schools
Tyler Oakley, YouTuber, blogger, and LGBT activist
Larry Page, co-founder of Google, went to Montessori School in Okemos
Heather Raffo, playwright, author of Nine Parts of Desire
John Bennett Ramsey, father of JonBenét Ramsey, attended Okemos High School
Andrew Robl, professional poker player
Tom Welling, actor, played Clark Kent in television series Smallville

Points of interest
Goetsch–Winckler House.  Designed by Frank Lloyd Wright, and of the earlier examples of his "Usonian" houses.  
The Meridian Historical Village and farmers market
Ferguson Park, along the Red Cedar River on Okemos Road, is thought to be the meeting place where Chief Okemos and the war chiefs held their powwows. The park is part of the oldest settlement in the area along the plank road between Detroit and the Capitol in Lansing.
The Hamilton Building at 2160 Hamilton Road (near the Four Corners of Okemos), is the oldest commercial building in Okemos, and replaced the old Walker General Store, which was built in 1853. The Hamilton Building held its first ice cream social on June 11, 1904, and was built to house the Independent Order of Odd Fellows, a charity organization. The planks in the building are from the walnut grove on which it sits. Along with Ferguson Park, it is also part of the oldest settlement in the area along the old plank road between Detroit and the Capitol in Lansing.
Nancy Moore Park
Meridian Mall
The Hope Borbas Okemos branch of the Capital Area District Library

References

External links
Okemos Public Schools
Meridian Mall

 
Census-designated places in Michigan
Unincorporated communities in Ingham County, Michigan
Lansing–East Lansing metropolitan area
Populated places established in 1839
Unincorporated communities in Michigan
Census-designated places in Ingham County, Michigan
1839 establishments in Michigan